Mesoridazine (Serentil) is a piperidine neuroleptic drug belonging to the class of drugs called phenothiazines, used in the treatment of schizophrenia. It is a metabolite of thioridazine. The drug's name is derived from the methylsulfoxy and piperidine functional groups in its chemical structure.

It has central antiadrenergic, antidopaminergic, antiserotonergic and weak muscarinic anticholinergic effects.

Serious side effects include akathisia, tardive dyskinesia and the potentially fatal neuroleptic malignant syndrome.

Mesoridazine was withdrawn from the United States market in 2004 due to dangerous side effects, namely irregular heart beat and QT-prolongation of the electrocardiogram.

It currently appears to be unavailable worldwide.

Synthesis

2-Methylthiophenothiazine [7643-08-5] (1) is treated with acetic anhydride] to give the protected amide, ie 10-acetyl-2-methylthiophenothiazine, CID:69367526. Oxidation of this by means of hydrogen peroxide and removal of the acetyl protecting group with potassium carbonate in methanol solution gives 2-methylsulfonylphenothiazine [23503-68-6] (3). Introduction of the sidechain by alkylation with 2-(2-chlorethyl)-1-methylpiperidine [50846-01-0] (6) in the presence of sodamide, afforded the desired mesoridazine (5).

References 

Muscarinic antagonists
Phenothiazines
Piperidines
Sulfoxides
Tertiary amines
Typical antipsychotics
Withdrawn drugs